Little Rock is the capital of the U.S. state of Arkansas.

Little Rock or Littlerock may also refer to:

Places
 Little Rock, Arkansas
 Little Rock Union Station, a railway station
 Littlerock, California
 Little Rock, Illinois
 Little Rock, Indiana
 Little Rock, Iowa
 Little Rock, Beltrami County, Minnesota, a census-designated place
 Little Rock, Morrison County, Minnesota. an unincorporated community
 Little Rock, Oklahoma
 Little Rock, South Carolina
 Littlerock, Washington
 Little Rock Air Force Base, in Jacksonville, Arkansas
 Little Rock Creek (disambiguation)
 Little Rock Dam
 Little Rock Township, Kendall County, Illinois
 Little Rock Township, Nobles County, Minnesota

People
 Little Rock (Cheyenne chief)

Music
 "Little Rock" (Reba McEntire song), 1986
 "Little Rock" (Collin Raye song), 1994
 Little Rock (album),  Hayes Carll album), 2005

Other uses 
 Littlerock (film), a 2010 film
 Little Rock (poem), composition by Cuban writer Nicolás Guillén
 Little Rock Crisis, a forced school desegregation during the American Civil Rights Movement
 , several ships of the United States Navy
 Little Rock Trojans, the athletic program of the University of Arkansas at Little Rock